Yamil/Tamaui Rural LLG is a local-level government (LLG) of East Sepik Province, Papua New Guinea.

Wards
01. Kombikum
02. Gwarip
03. Bengrakum
04. Yaunjange
05. Suambukum
06.Naramko 

06. Kwimbu 1
07. Malba 1
08. Ulupu
09. Yalahine
10. Yamil 1
11. Waikakum 1
12. Waikakum 3
13. Saikisi 1
14. Dumbit
15. Yenigo
16. Mendiamin

References

Local-level governments of East Sepik Province